The shadow cabinet minister for international development is the lead spokesperson for the United Kingdom's Official Opposition on issues related to international aid, most notably to the Third World. The shadow cabinet minister holds the Minister of State for Development and Africa to account in Parliament. The role previously had no counterpart in the Government between 2020 and 2022 after the Department for International Development (DFID) and the role of international development secretary was abolished by the second Johnson government in 2020. The position was renamed from Shadow Secretary of State for International Development in November 2021 and placed under the Shadow Foreign Secretary.

The shadow minister also holds the Foreign Secretary and other FCDO ministers to account in Parliament. DFID was abolished in 2020 but Keir Starmer retained the role in his Shadow Cabinet.

Before Tony Blair established DfID in his first government after coming to power in 1997, there was a minister for overseas development ("minister of" before 1970) who was a part of the Foreign and Commonwealth Office. Since 1989, the shadow minister or shadow secretary has usually been a member of the shadow cabinet.

Shadow Ministers and Secretaries

Notes

References

Official Opposition (United Kingdom)
Department for International Development